Domingo Rodríguez Martell (born 1 August 1965) is a Mexican politician from the Party of the Democratic Revolution. From 2009 to 2012 he served as Deputy of the LXI Legislature of the Mexican Congress representing San Luis Potosí. He was previously the municipal president of Tanlajás from 1997 to 2000.

References

1965 births
Living people
Party of the Democratic Revolution politicians
20th-century Mexican politicians
21st-century Mexican politicians
Deputies of the LXI Legislature of Mexico
Members of the Chamber of Deputies (Mexico) for San Luis Potosí
Municipal presidents in San Luis Potosí
Politicians from San Luis Potosí
People from Tamazunchale